Felix Becker may refer to:
 Felix Becker (art historian) (1864–1928), German art historian
 Felix Becker (fencer) (born 1964), German fencer
 Felix Becker (officer) (1893–1979), German military officer